Aleksandr Guz (born 22 May 2004) is a Belarusian professional footballer who plays for Isloch Minsk Raion.

References

External links 
 

2004 births
Living people
People from Rechytsa
Sportspeople from Gomel Region
Belarusian footballers
Association football midfielders
FC Isloch Minsk Raion players
Belarusian Premier League players